The 10th Okinawa gubernatorial election was held on November 19, 2006.

Results 
 
 
 
    
 
 
 
 

 1: supported by LDP and NKP.
 2: supported by DPJ, JCP, SDP, PNP and NPN.

External links 
 Official results 

2006 elections in Japan
2006
November 2006 events in Japan